Khulna District Stadium, established in 1958, is a football stadium which is located by the Khulna Shishu Hospital, Khulna, Bangladesh.

See also
Stadiums in Bangladesh
List of football stadiums in Bangladesh

References

Football venues in Bangladesh
Buildings and structures in Khulna
Sport in Khulna